was a Japanese photographer.

In 1922, Fuku went to the United States where he worked in the dry goods business in Seattle. In the mid-1930s, he was very active both in the submission of his photographs to various salons and in photographic circles in Seattle, where he also had a solo exhibition in 1935. He returned to Japan in 1936 and the next year had a solo exhibition in Mitsukoshi department store. From 1940 he taught photography at Nihon University for one year. After World War II, Fuku ran a commercial photographic studio in Kyōbashi, Tokyo.

References

Nihon no shashin: Uchinaru katachi, sotonaru katachi 1: Torai kara 1945 made / Japanese Photography: Form In/Out 1: From Its Introduction to 1945. Tokyo: Tokyo Metropolitan Museum of Photography, 1996.  Exhibition catalogue. Text and captions in Japanese and English. Fuku's "At the Dry Dock" (c. 1934) appears on p. 89. 
 Nihon no shashinka / Biographic Dictionary of Japanese Photography. Tokyo: Nichigai Associates, 2005. . 
Nihon shashinka jiten / 328 Outstanding Japanese Photographers. Kyoto: Tankōsha, 2000. . Despite its alternative English title, in Japanese only. 

Japanese photographers
Japanese expatriates in the United States
1898 births
1965 deaths
Nihon University alumni
Artists from Seattle